Edward Holland Jr. (born October 30, 1939) is an American singer, songwriter, and record producer.

Holland was born in Detroit, Michigan, United States. Although he was an early Motown artist who recorded minor hit singles such as "Jamie", he started working behind the scenes due to stage fright. He was a member of Holland–Dozier–Holland, the songwriting and production team responsible for much of the Motown Sound and hit records by Martha and the Vandellas, The Supremes, The Four Tops, and The Isley Brothers, among others. He has written or co-written 80 hits in the UK and 143 in the US charts.

Holland served as the team's lyricist, and also worked with producer Norman Whitfield on lyrics for the songs he produced for the Marvelettes and the Temptations, like "Too Many Fish in the Sea" and "Beauty Is Only Skin Deep".

Holland also composed songs for the First Wives Club musical.

Discography

Albums 

 Eddie Holland (1962, Motown MT604)
 It Moves Me - The Complete Recordings 1958-1964 (2012, Ace CDTOP2 1331)

Singles

References

External links
Eddie Holland Interview – NAMM Oral History Library (2004)

1939 births
Living people
African-American songwriters
Record producers from Michigan
Motown artists
Singers from Detroit
21st-century African-American people
20th-century African-American people
Singer-songwriters from Michigan